Rhys Sharpe (born 17 October 1994) is a Northern Irish footballer who plays for National League North side Kettering Town, where he plays as a defender.

Playing career

Derby County
Born in Nottingham, Sharpe was a Derby County youth graduate and in April 2013, Sharpe signed his first professional contract on a two-year after he completed his two-year scholarship programmes. On 13 March 2015 he was loaned to League Two side Shrewsbury Town on a month's youth loan. Four days later Sharpe made his professional debut, starting in a 4–1 away win against Morecambe, with the loan later extended until the end of the season.

At the end of the season, Sharpe returned to his parent club, and was released.

Notts County
He joined Notts County on a two-year contract on 2 June 2015. He was released by mutual consent on 12 August 2016.

Swindon Town
On 6 December 2016, Sharpe joined League One side Swindon Town on a short-term deal. After appearing once in the EFL Trophy, Sharpe was released at the end of his contract in January 2017.

Matlock Town
On 9 March 2017, Sharpe joined Northern Premier League Premier Division side Matlock Town.

Tamworth
Rhys signed for National League North side Tamworth on 2 February 2018, having spent a period on trial with the club at the beginning if the season, but an injury scuppered any chance of the player earning a contract. Following some impressive performances, Sharpe signed an extension to his contract on 1 March 2018.

Nuneaton Borough
Sharpe signed for National League North side Nuneaton Borough on 4 January 2019, on a six-month deal.

Stratford Town
Sharpe started the 2020/21 season playing for Southern League Premier Central side Stratford Town however due to lockdown regulations put in place because of Covid 19 the league program was halted after 8 games in October 2020 and the season declared void.

Kettering Town
With Stratford Town's season being terminated  Rhys signed for Kettering Town on November 27 2020 making his debut the following day away at Hereford FC

International career

Northern Ireland U21
Sharpe was called up by Northern Ireland national under-20 football team in July 2013, and made his debut against Denmark, before making two more appearances against USA and Mexico.

In October 2013, Sharpe was called by Northern Ireland U21. Sharpe made his national team debut, playing 90 minutes, in a 1–0 loss against Belgium U21.

Career statistics

References

External links
 
 
 
 Northern Ireland profile at NIFG

1994 births
Living people
English footballers
Association footballers from Northern Ireland
Association football defenders
Derby County F.C. players
Mickleover Sports F.C. players
Shrewsbury Town F.C. players
English Football League players
Northern Ireland under-21 international footballers
Footballers from Nottingham
Notts County F.C. players
Swindon Town F.C. players
Matlock Town F.C. players
Tamworth F.C. players
Nuneaton Borough F.C. players